Moses Wheelock Field (February 10, 1828 –  March 14, 1889) was a businessman and politician. He served as a member of the United States House of Representatives from the U.S. state of Michigan, and was instrumental in organizing the Independent Greenback Party.

Early life and education
Field was born in Watertown, New York, the son of William Field and Rebecca (Wheelock) Field. He moved with his parents to Cato, New York, and attended public schools and graduated from the academy in Victor, New York

In 1844, he moved to Detroit, Michigan, and engaged in mercantile and agricultural pursuits. Here he married Mary Kercheval whose father, Benjamin Kercheval (1793-1855), had been an officer in the War of 1812. He built a house on Field Avenue which his mother-in-law thought was too far from the center of town.  He operated the Detroit Glass Works and the Detroit Hoop Manufacturing Company. In 1865, he was instrumental in establishing the Michigan State Society for the Prevention of Cruelty to Animals, and helped create state laws relating to the humane treatment of animals.  He is credited with helping establish an art museum in Detroit, and helping establish public drinking fountains in Detroit in 1871.  Field served as Alderman of Detroit from 1863 to 1865.

Career
He was elected as a Republican candidate from Michigan's 1st congressional district to the 43rd Congress, serving from March 4, 1873, to March 3, 1875. He was an unsuccessful candidate for re-election in 1874 to the Forty-fourth Congress.

Field was instrumental in organizing the Independent Greenback Party, having called the national convention at Indianapolis, Indiana, on May 17, 1876. Governor Josiah Begole appointed him a trustee of the Eastern Asylum for the Insane in 1883. 
 
In 1888, Field was elected to an eight-year term as Regent of the University of Michigan. He died on March 14, 1889, before completing the term.

At the time of his death, he lived on his farm, "Linden Lawn," in the township of Hamtramck, a suburb of Detroit. He is interred in Woodmere Cemetery.

Personal life
On February 2, 1858, Field married Mary Kercheval. They had ten children, including Vincent Field, Alice Field and Mary Field. His family were members of the Swedenborgian Church.

References

External links 
 	

Picture of the Moses Whelock Field Home

1828 births
1889 deaths
Politicians from Watertown, New York
Detroit City Council members
Regents of the University of Michigan
Michigan Greenbacks
People from Cayuga County, New York
People from Hamtramck, Michigan
Politicians from Detroit
Republican Party members of the United States House of Representatives from Michigan
People from Victor, New York
19th-century American politicians